Peacock's Lock Viaduct is a stone arch bridge over the Schuylkill River near Reading, Pennsylvania, constructed by the Philadelphia and Reading Railroad between 1853 and 1856. It is named for a nearby lock on the Schuylkill Canal. The bridge is notable for its pierced spandrels, or circular openings between the arch rings and the deck. While this feature is found on some European bridges, it is extremely rare, if not unique, in the United States.

See also
List of bridges documented by the Historic American Engineering Record in Pennsylvania
List of crossings of the Schuylkill River

References

External links

Bridges completed in 1856
Bridges in Berks County, Pennsylvania
Historic American Engineering Record in Pennsylvania
Railroad bridges in Pennsylvania
Bridges over the Schuylkill River
Reading Railroad bridges
Viaducts in the United States
Stone arch bridges in the United States